The Amazing Transplant is an American 1970 sexploitation film, written, produced and directed by Doris Wishman. The film stars Juan Fernandez, Linda Southern, and Larry Hunter.

Plot

Arthur (Juan Fernandez) visits Mary (Sandy Eden) to profess his love and propose to her. But when he notices her earrings, he begins to rape her and winds up choking her to death. His mother (Linda Southern) is worried and asks her police detective brother-in-law Bill (Larry Hunter) to help find him. Meanwhile, Mary has been found dead, the police suspect Arthur and the radio informs the public about the apparent murder.

In the course of his investigation, Bill finds several women who tell of Arthur's surprising rapes (since he seems an otherwise pleasant guy) while they are graphically shown in flashbacks. Each one has a different character: One is a violent rape scene, one victim (a highschool acquaintance) turns the rape into lovemaking, another (lesbian) victim is so repelled that she vomits afterwards.

Only the viewer gets to see the connection however, the glistening earrings each victim wears, and which set Arthur off. The story finally is explained to Bill by Dr. Meade (Bernard Marcel) who a couple of months ago performed a penis transplant on Arthur which may have also transplanted the former womanizing owner's fondness of golden earrings.

Cast

 Juan Fernandez (Arthur Barlen)
 Linda Southern (Ann Barlen, Arthur's mother)
 Larry Hunter (Det. Bill Barlen, Arthur's uncle)
 Olive Denneccio (Edie Stone)
 Sandy Eden (Mary Thorne)
 Kim Pope (Ms. Evans)
 Bernard Marcel (Dr. Cyril Meade (billed as E.B. Priest))
 Suzzan Landau (Bobbie's lover)
 Janet Banzet (Bobbie Revan (billed as Pat Barrett))

DVD release

See also
 List of American films of 1970

References

External links

1970 films
Films directed by Doris Wishman
Films about organ transplantation
Films about rape
1970s exploitation films
1970s English-language films
1970s American films